Soulbound (Portuguese: Teus Olhos Meus) is a 2011 Brazilian drama film directed and written by Caio Sóh.

The film follows the story of Gil, a 20-year-old orphan, raised by his uncles. His lifestyle generates a family war, causing Gil to go away from home. With the guitar on his back, without money and without the help of friends, Gil meets Otávio, a music producer who changes his destiny forever.

Cast

References

External links
   
 

2011 drama films
Brazilian drama films
Brazilian LGBT-related films
Films shot in Rio de Janeiro (city)
2011 LGBT-related films
2011 films
LGBT-related drama films